KDZ or Kdz may refer to:

 Kdz. Ereğli Belediye Spor, the women's football side of Karadeniz Ereğli Belediye Spor Kulübü
 Kunduz Province (ISO 3166-2:AF code: AF-KDZ), one of the 34 provinces of Afghanistan
 Mfumte language (ISO 639-3 code: kdz), a Grassfields Bantu language of Cameroon
 Korean Demilitarized Zone, the border between North Korea and South Korea